In Greek mythology, two virgin Oechalides were transformed into trees by the nymphs when they revealed the fate of a disappeared priestess. They dwelled in Oechalia, a town in ancient Thessaly.

Mythology 
After Dryope married Andraemon and gave birth to Apollo's son Amphissus, she and her husband erected a temple to Apollo, where Dryope served as a priestess. One day the nymphs took Dryope with them and left a poplar tree in her place. Two virgin women of the town told the rest that the nymphs had seized Dryope; the nymphs in anger turned them both into fir trees. This was supposedly why women were not allowed in the foot-race in honour of Apollo at Oechalia.

See also 

 Cerambus
 Sisyphus
 Clytie

Footnotes

References

Bibliography 
 Antoninus Liberalis, The Metamorphoses of Antoninus Liberalis translated by Francis Celoria (Routledge 1992). Online version at the Topos Text Project.
 
 

Metamorphoses into trees in Greek mythology
Thessalian characters in Greek mythology
Women in Greek mythology